Ghentia is a genus of tephritid  or fruit flies in the family Tephritidae.

Species
Ghentia millepunctatum Bezzi, 1918

References

Tephritinae
Tephritidae genera
Diptera of Africa